Al Hajj Shah Mahmood Popal is a citizen of Afghanistan who was a candidate in Afghanistan's 2009 Presidential elections.
Popal is a politician and a former commander during the Soviet occupation of Afghanistan.

He led the Afghanistan National Islamic Peace Party for six years.

Popal completed his high school education in 1985, in Peshawar, Pakistan, at the Omar Sani High School.

Popal fought as a jihadi commander under the National Islamic Front of Afghanistan during the Soviet occupation of Afghanistan.

He served briefly as the Governor of Logar Province, the Province where he was born, during the Afghan Interim Administration that followed the ouster of the Taliban, and preceded the elected administrations, that followed the adoption of a new constitution.

Popal stood for election during Afghanistan's 2009 Presidential elections but withdrew his candidacy prior to the elections.

References

Alhaj Shah Mahmood Popal has been known as the leader of the national peace party since 2003. His leadership authority will be authenticated until 2016. However, an election to choose the new leader will be organised after the end of his leadership period.

1966 births
Living people
National Islamic Front of Afghanistan politicians